Paul Whitfield (born 6 May 1982) is a Welsh footballer, who played as a goalkeeper. He made appearances in the English Football League with Wrexham, and was part of their promotion-winning 2002–03 season from the Football League Third Division. He is now goalkeeping coach for the under-18 and under-23 teams at Swansea City.

Career
Whitfield started at Wrexham, coming through the youth team. His run with the team however was plagued by injury, needing an operation for a cartilage in his right leg from an injury sustained in the warm-up for a game against Kidderminster Harriers.

During his time with club he spent time on loan at The New Saints during the 2000–01 season and travelled with the club to Estonia for a Uefa Champions League match against FC Levadia Tallinn.  He also spent additional loan spells at both Connah's Quay Nomads and Newtown.

Whilst at Wrexham, Whitfield would earn a Wales under-21 cap against Azerbaijan. He was named as an unused substitute for another eight Wales under-21 games between 2001 and 2003.

After leaving Wrexham in 2004, Whitfield would play for various clubs in the Welsh Premier League including Bangor City, Airbus UK and Rhyl. He also played for Buckley Town. For the 2007–08 season he moved to Cammell Laird where he helped them win promotion to the Unibond Premier League.  He returned to Wales playing for Llangefni Town and hometown club Llandudno, where in the first season he won the Welsh League Cup in the first season and narrowly missed out on promotion to the Welsh Premier League.  In 2013 he re-joined former club Rhyl and later played for Caernarfon Town and Llandudno Albion, helping them reach the FAW Trophy final in the 2019–20 season, although the final was not played due to the Coronavirus pandemic. During the early part of the 2021–22 season he again played for Llandudno, playing the full-game in a Welsh Cup match against Llay Welfare.

Coaching
Whitfield now works as a coach, having been named goalkeeping coach at Prestatyn Town in August 2017 and having been head coach at Rhyl FC's Academy. He has also worked with the Welsh FA's Under-19's Women's National team and been goalkeeping coach at The New Saints. He returned to Llandudno FC as goalkeeping coach in June 2020 and stayed with the club until January 2022.

Between November 2020 and January 2022 he was also an goalkeeping coach at Liverpool's academy. In January 2022 he joined Swansea City's coaching staff as a full-time goalkeeping coach for their under-18 and under-23 teams.

Personal life
Whitfield is an Everton fan.

Career statistics

References

1982 births
Living people
Airbus UK Broughton F.C. players
Bangor City F.C. players
Buckley Town F.C. players
Caernarfon Town F.C. players
Cammell Laird 1907 F.C. players
Connah's Quay Nomads F.C. players
Llandudno F.C. players
Llandudno Albion F.C. players
Llangefni Town F.C. players
Newtown A.F.C. players
Rhyl F.C. players
The New Saints F.C. players
Wrexham A.F.C. players
Liverpool F.C. non-playing staff
Swansea City A.F.C. non-playing staff
The New Saints F.C. non-playing staff
Association football goalkeepers
Cymru Premier players
English Football League players
Wales under-21 international footballers
Welsh footballers
Sportspeople from St Asaph